The WWP World Tag Team Championship is a professional wrestling championship in the South African professional wrestling promotion World Wrestling Professionals, contested among tag teams of any weight. It was created in April 2004 when WWP debuted its television show, WWP Thunderstrike.

Title history

See also

World Wrestling Professionals

References

External links

Tag team wrestling championships
World Wrestling Professionals championships